Barking is a constituency formed in 1945, and represented since then by a member of the Labour Party in the House of Commons of the UK Parliament. Since 1994, its Member of Parliament has been Margaret Hodge.

Political history
The area has elected Labour MPs since its creation in 1945, on strong majorities of 20.4% of the vote or greater, except for the results in 1983 and 1987.

The rise in support for the British National Party since the turn of the 21st century saw the party attain 17% of the vote at the 2005 general election. Party members and supporters were optimistic that the party would soon make the breakthrough into UK parliament, and party leader Nick Griffin stood in Barking for the 2010 general election. However, his performance in Barking was poor, as he polled 14.8% of the vote (which actually represented a decline in percentage terms compared to 2005), and Margaret Hodge retained the seat with more than half of the vote. During the run-up to the 2010 election, filmmaker Laura Fairrie had access to the British National Party and Labour Party campaigns, and later produced a documentary The Battle for Barking, which premiered on More 4 on 30 November 2010.

Bucking the national trend, the incumbent MP Margaret Hodge almost doubled her majority at the 2010 general election.

Constituency profile
Set in the east of Greater London, the Barking constituency is one of the areas identified for London's planned expansion in housing. The Barking Riverside regeneration project aims to create new homes, jobs and services on the site of the former power station.

Having returned Labour MPs since 1945, Margaret Hodge has served as the MP for the seat since 1994. A challenge from the BNP in 2005 saw the Labour vote reduced by over 13% from the 2001 general election. The BNP, with 16.9% of the vote, out-polled the Liberal Democrats for third place and were 27 votes behind the Conservatives.

According to 2011 United Kingdom census data, the seat had the 21st highest proportion of unemployed people amongst constituencies in England and Wales, at 7.4%. It also has the third-highest proportion of people from Africa, while one in six identifies as Asian/Asian British. In 2010, Labour won with 54.3% of the vote, Conservatives 17.8%, BNP 14.6%.

In 2015, the UKIP vote increased to almost 23%, this was predicted as they came the runners up in every ward in the 2014 Barking and Dagenham Council election, they came within 200 votes of winning 4 seats on the council.

In 2017, the UKIP vote collapsed, and Labour and the Conservatives both increased their share of the vote, although Labour's increase of 10.1% saw them claim 67.8% of the vote overall (their largest share in Barking at any election since the 1994 by-election and the greatest at a general election since 1970), increasing their majority from 35.5% to 45.3%.

The constituency has benefited from the 2012 Summer Olympics in London and its districts include a larger than average proportion of social housing and earners on low incomes.

Boundaries 

1945–1974: The Municipal Borough of Barking.

1974–1983: The London Borough of Barking wards of Abbey, Cambell, Gascoigne, Longbridge, and Manor.

1983–1997: The London Borough of Barking and Dagenham wards of Abbey, Cambell, Eastbury, Gascoigne, Goresbrook, Longbridge, Manor, Parsloes, and Thames.

1997–2010: The London Borough of Barking and Dagenham wards of Abbey, Becontree, Cambell, Eastbury, Gascoigne, Goresbrook, Longbridge, Manor, Parsloes, and Thames.

2010–present: The London Borough of Barking and Dagenham wards of Abbey, Alibon, Becontree, Eastbury, Gascoigne, Goresbrook, Longbridge, Mayesbrook, Parsloes, Thames, and Valence.

2010 boundary changes
Following their review of parliamentary representation the Boundary Commission for England recommended that the wards of Alibon, Parsloes and Valence be transferred from the old Dagenham constituency to Barking, and that following a review of ward boundaries a small part of River ward be transferred from Barking to help form the new Dagenham and Rainham constituency. These boundaries were first contested for the 2010 general election.

2016 boundary review

Under this review, consulted on in 2016, Alibon and Valence Wards would transfer out to Dagenham-and-Rainham constituency, and Goodmayes and Mayfield Wards would transfer in from Ilford South constituency.

Members of Parliament

Elections

Elections in the 2010s

Elections in the 2000s

Elections in the 1990s

 Changes are based on the 1992 election result, not the 1994 by-election.
:

Elections in the 1980s

Elections in the 1970s

Elections in the 1960s

Elections in the 1950s

Elections in the 1940s

Notes

References

External links 
Politics Resources (Election results from 1922 onwards)
Electoral Calculus (Election results from 1955 onwards)

Parliamentary constituencies in London
Constituencies of the Parliament of the United Kingdom established in 1945
Politics of the London Borough of Barking and Dagenham
Barking, London